Grand Bé is a tidal island near Saint-Malo, France. It is located at the mouth of the Rance River, a few hundred metres from the walls of Saint-Malo. At low tide the island can be reached on foot from the nearby Bon-Secours beach. On the island are the remains of an ancient fort.

François-René de Chateaubriand, a French writer native to Saint-Malo, is buried on the island, in a grave facing the sea.

See also 
 Petit Bé

External links 
  Information about Grand Bé fort

Saint-Malo Islands
Tidal islands of France
Forts of Saint-Malo
Vauban fortifications in France